This is a list of listed buildings in Inverclyde. The list is split out by parish.

 List of listed buildings in Gourock, Inverclyde
 List of listed buildings in Greenock
 List of listed buildings in Inverkip, Inverclyde
 List of listed buildings in Kilmacolm, Inverclyde
 List of listed buildings in Port Glasgow, Inverclyde

Inverclyde